The 1996 Laurie O'Reilly Cup was the thirth edition of the competition and was held on 31st August at Sydney.
New Zealand retained the O'Reilly Cup after defeating Australia 5–28.

Match

References 

Laurie O'Reilly Cup
Australia women's national rugby union team
New Zealand women's national rugby union team
Laurie O'Reilly Cup